Mahesh Bhupathi and Leander Paes were the defending champions, but this year Bhupathi played with Rohan Bopanna and Paes, who also won the tournament in 2010, played with Radek Štěpánek.
Bhupathi and Bopanna were defeated in the semifinals by Max Mirnyi and Daniel Nestor, who were then defeated in the final by Paes and Štěpánek 3–6, 6–1, [10–8].

Seeds

Draw

Finals

Top half

Bottom half

References
Main Draw

Sony Ericsson Open - Men's Doubles
2012 Sony Ericsson Open
Men in Florida